There are no worldwide uniform standards regulating the provision of assistance for airline passengers with disabilities. American regulations place the responsibility on the airlines, the European Union's rules make the airport responsible for providing the assistance, and in South America there are no regulations at all. The International Air Transport Association (IATA) is concerned about the difficulties caused by inconsistent regulations.

European Union
According to EU regulation 1107/2006, persons with reduced mobility have the right to assistance during airline travel. The assistance is mandated for flights on any airline departing from an airport in the EU or flights to an airport in the EU on an aircraft registered in any EU country. The EU has specific regulations regarding airline passengers with reduced mobility. No passenger may be turned away due to their disability, except for reasons based on safety. Assistance should be provided to these passengers, either through the airport or a third party hired by the airport, and the EU provides guidance in training airport employees in assisting these passengers. The EU recommends that the extra cost of these services be covered by every airline at the airport proportionate to the number of passengers each one carries. Passengers should be compensated for damaged items such as wheelchairs and assistive devices "in accordance with rules of international, Community and national law" Unfortunately the Montreal Convention restricts compensation to 1,131 SDRs (around $1,500), significantly less than the value of many wheelchairs.

United States
The Air Carrier Access Act of 1986 prohibits commercial airlines from discriminating against passengers with disabilities. The act was passed by the U.S. Congress in direct response to a narrow interpretation of Section 504 of the Rehabilitation Act of 1973 by the U.S. Supreme Court in U.S. Department of Transportation (DOT) v. Paralyzed Veterans of America (PVA) (1986). In this case, the Supreme Court held that private, commercial air carriers are not liable under Section 504 because they are not "direct recipients" of federal funding to airports.

Airlines are required to provide passengers with disabilities any assistance they may need in order to travel properly like all other passengers. This includes allowing them with a wheelchair or other guided assistance to board, helping them disembark from a plane upon landing, or connecting these individuals to another flight. Individuals with disabilities are also required to seating accommodation assistance meets their disability-related needs.

The U.S. Department of Transportation does not now include emotional support animals in the Air Carrier Access Act (ACAA), the act that allows service animals to fly on airplanes if they meet requirements. Before December 2020, they did include emotional support animals in their definition of service animals (US Department of Transportation, 2020).

In 2022, it was announced that the U.S. Department of Transportation (DOT) had published the Airline Passengers with Disabilities Bill of Rights. It (as stated by the DOT) “describes the fundamental rights of air travelers with disabilities under the Air Carrier Access Act and its implementing regulation, 14 Code of Federal Regulations (CFR) Part 382.”

IATA ticket codes
Specific IATA codes are used on the flight ticket to indicate the kind of assistance the person needs, such as wheelchair assistance inside the terminal, between the terminal and the plane, climbing up/down to/from the plane, and moving within the plane.

References 

Aviation law
Accessible transportation